European Pétanque Championships are organised by the European Pétanque Federation (Confédération Européenne de Pétanque – CEP) in collaboration with its member country federations. There are five main player groups for competitions: Youth (under 18), Up-and-coming (Espoirs, under 23), Women, Men, and Veteran (over 55). Competitors play a variety of games according to their age. The results of the Championships – excluding Veteran – determine the top 24 Nations to represent Europe at the FIPJP Pétanque World Championship.

History 
 1990s – the idea for a new competition for Youth and Women European players is first discussed by the German and Danish Federations
 1998 – France, supporting the idea, invite teams for an inaugural event in Dijon, France.
 1999 – foundation of CEP in Strasbourg, France
 2000 – 1st Official European Championship for Juniors in Liège, Belgium supported by the Belgian Federation
 2001 – 1st European Championship for Women in Strasbourg, France.
 2005–2007 – discussion of the need to create an Espoirs  ("up-and-coming") category for young players over 18 but not yet ready for "Open Championships",  to build up more competitive experience
 2008 – 1st European Championship for Espoirs in St-Jean-D'Angely, France.
 2009 – final but not least, 1st European Championship for Men in Nice, France.
 2015 – France wins 4th title in Men's Triple and remain unbeaten in this competition.
 2016 – new Championship Category created: Single Men & Women

Medallists

Youth (Under 18) 

Youth players compete in an Open Triple Game Championship in teams of four players, and individually in a Precision Shooting Championship. Youth competitions are held in even-numbered years, and the results are considered when selecting entrants to the World Championships.

Triple team  (Triplette)

Precision Shooting (Tir de Précision)

Women 

Women's players compete in a Triple Game Championship in teams of four players, and individually in a Precision Shooting Championship. In addition, there is a single head-to-head competition. Women's competitions are presently held in even-numbered years, and the results are taken into account when selecting entrants to the World Championships.

Triple team  (Triplette)

Precision Shooting (Tir de Précision)

Single (Tête-à-tête)

Espoirs (Under 23 years old) 

In the Espoirs Championships, Young Men and Young Women compete separately in teams of four players in a combination of games: a Triple game, and a Double game played simultaneously with a Single game. Espoirs compete in odd-numbered years.

Men 

Men's players compete in a Triple Game Championship in teams of four players, and individually in a Precision Shooting Championship. In addition, there is a single head-to-head competition. Men's competitions are held in even-numbered years, and the results are taken into account when deciding entrants to the World Championships.

Triple Team  (Triplette)

Precision Shooting (Tir de Précision)

Single (Tête à tête)

Veteran (Over 55 years old) 

Veterans compete in even-numbered years in a Triple Game Championship with teams of four players.

Triple Team (Triplette)

Ranking by Country: Youth / Women / Men

References

External links
 https://web.archive.org/web/20160817093036/http://www.fepetanca.com/Cto_Eur_Juv.html
 http://www.boulistenaute.com/actualite-championnats-europe-petanque-4e-chp-europe-petanque-jeunes-2004-dudelange-lux-2512
 https://web.archive.org/web/20160807001225/http://www.fbfp.be/europe2002/historique.htm
 https://web.archive.org/web/20160807044405/http://www.fbfp.be/europe2002/resultats.htm
 https://web.archive.org/web/20160818145434/http://www.cep-petanque.com/shooting.html
 http://www.boulistenaute.com/actualite-championnats-europe-petanque-carton-plein-france-bassens-17734
 https://web.archive.org/web/20170127224048/http://www.federbocce.it/files/petanque/2013/Campionati%20Europei%20Maschili/European_Men_Championship/Home_files/Nazioni%20Partecipanti.pdf
 http://petanqueparaylemonial.sportsregions.fr/actualites-du-club/championnat-d-europe-senior-masculin-a-albena-en-bulgarie-446367
 http://stages-billard-petanque.over-blog.fr/article-championnat-d-europe-2011-a-goeteborg-la-france-championne-82075400.html
 https://web.archive.org/web/20160818130109/http://www.cep-petanque.com/about.html

Pétanque